St Paul's United Football Club is a Saint Kitts and Nevis football club from St Paul's. They however play their home matches at the Warner Park in Basseterre.

They usually play in the Saint Kitts and Nevis Premier Division, but due to a conflict between the FA and the majority of the clubs, they don't take part in 2008/2009.

History
St Paul's United have won the domestic championship four times.

Achievements
Saint Kitts and Nevis Premier Division: 5
 1999, 2008–09, 2013–14, 2014–15, 2019–20
Saint Kitts and Nevis National Cup: 1
 2011–12

Squad

2007/2008 season

External links
Club profile – SKNFA

Football clubs in Saint Kitts and Nevis
Association football clubs established in 1962
1962 establishments in Saint Kitts and Nevis